Georg Ferdinand Helm (15 March 1851 in Dresden, Saxony – 13 September 1923 in Dresden) was a German mathematician.

Helm graduated from high school from the Annenschule in Dresden in 1867. Thereafter he studied mathematics and natural sciences at the Dresden Polytechnical School, and then at the universities of Leipzig and Berlin from 1871 to 1873.

Helm first taught at the Annenschule, his high school alma mater.  Then he taught mathematics and physics at the Dresden University of Technology and at the Royal Saxon Polytechnic from 1888 until 1922.   He was an interdisciplinarian, whose teaching responsibilities included a seminar on insurance statistics.   Helm coined the term “mathematical chemistry”.  His work in the area of economics postulated that money was the economic equivalent of the lowest form of social entropy as described in his work “Teachings on Energy” (in German, Lehre von der Energie, 1887).

Selected works
 Lehre von der Energie (Leipzig, 1887) 
 Grundzüge der mathematischen Chemie (1894) 
 The principles of mathematical chemistry: The energetics of chemical phenomena (New York, 1897) 
 Die Energetik (Leipzig, 1898)
 Die Theorien der Elektrodynamik nach ihrer geschichtlichen Entwicklung (Leipzig, 1904) 
 Die Grundlehren der höheren Mathematik (Leipzig, 1910)

References

External links
 

19th-century German mathematicians
20th-century German mathematicians
Scientists from Dresden
1851 births
1923 deaths